"The Harder I Try" is a song by British boyband Brother Beyond. Written and produced by Stock Aitken Waterman, it was released on 18 July 1988 as the fifth single from the band's debut album, Get Even (1988). The song peaked at number two on the UK Singles Chart the following month. It was a number-one hit in Ireland and entered the top 10 in Iceland while peaking within the top 20 in Belgium, the Netherlands, New Zealand, and Switzerland.

Background and release
In 1988, British production team Stock Aitken Waterman auctioned off their services for the Young Variety Club of Great Britain charity. Label EMI won the auction, and British boyband Brother Beyond was selected by Pete Waterman to be produced by the trio. The group had met Waterman previously when they had worked at PWL Studios on a prior single, "Can You Keep A Secret", and the producer liked the band. Brother Beyond was by then a struggling pop act, with their first four singles only making the lower reaches of the UK top 75 singles chart. EMI saw this as their much-needed breakthrough and agreed with Waterman on producing the group. The song was written in the morning, singer Nathan Moore was called in to record vocals, which were laid down over 3–4 hours. The rest of the band were not present and did not play on the record.

The resulting song, "The Harder I Try", samples the drum intro to the Isley Brothers' "This Old Heart of Mine". When released in July 1988, it became an instant success, peaking at number two on the UK Singles Chart for two weeks. The single topped the Irish Singles Chart and was mildly successful when released worldwide.

Critical reception
James Hamilton from Record Mirror wrote in his dance column, "Stock Aitken Waterman-created bpm old Motown-style fingersnappin' pulser, full of swimming harmonies and bright tinkles, and a sampled drum roll from the Isley Brothers 'This Old Heart of Mine'". Mike Soutar from Smash Hits named "The Harder I Try" Single of the Fortnight, adding, "It's quite obvious from the outset that Stock Aitken and Waterman are involved here, but happily they've not utterly swamped the song with their own inimitable "style". Instead it's very like old soul, very doo-wop, very "chicks" in the background warbling "ooooooooos", and very very catchy. Ah, the Yond' will make such good pop sensations..."

Track listings

 7-inch single
A. "The Harder I Try" – 3:24
B. "Remember Me" – 4:32

 12-inch single
A1. "The Harder I Try" (extended) – 6:05
B1. "Remember Me" (extended) – 6:48
B2. "The Harder I Try" (instrumental) – 3:43

 12-inch remix single
A1. "The Harder I Try" (The Hardest mix) – 7:05
B1. "The Harder I Try" (seven inch) – 3:24
B2. "Remember Me" (extended) – 6:48

 CD single
 "The Harder I Try" – 3:24
 "Remember Me" (extended) – 5:35
 "The Harder I Try" (extended) – 6:05
 "Sunset Bars" – 4:25

 Japanese mini-CD single
 "The Harder I Try"
 "Sunset Bars"

Charts

Weekly charts

Year-end charts

Certifications

References

1988 singles
1988 songs
Brother Beyond songs
Irish Singles Chart number-one singles
Parlophone singles
Song recordings produced by Stock Aitken Waterman
Songs written by Matt Aitken
Songs written by Mike Stock (musician)
Songs written by Pete Waterman